Breakfast with Brisbane was a television programme which provided live and recorded coverage of the 1982 Commonwealth Games. The programme was named after the location where the Games were being held.

The programme was broadcast from around 7am until around 9am and was presented by Desmond Lynam with studio analysis of the athletics events from Steve Ovett. David Icke presented round-ups of the latest Games news at 7.30am and at 8.30am. The programme also provided regular summaries of national and international news from the BBC Newsroom. These bulletins were read by David Cass.

The main focus of the programme was to provide live coverage of the athletics and the first edition of the programme was on the opening day of the track and field programme.

Breakfast with Brisbane was broadcast just over three months prior to the start of the BBC's breakfast television programme Breakfast Time.

References

BBC Television shows
British sports television series
BBC Sport
Breakfast television in the United Kingdom
1982 Commonwealth Games
1982 British television series debuts
1982 British television series endings